The National Council of Women's Organizations (NCWO) is an American non-profit umbrella organization of more than 100 women's organizations. The organization has a membership of more than 11 million women. In 2005, Susan Scanlan became the chair of NCWO. Shireen Mitchell is the founding chair of the Media and Technology taskforce.

Member organizations 
American Association of University Women
American Medical Women's Association
American Nurses Association
American Physical Therapy Association
American Psychological Association
American Women in Radio and Television
Aquinas College Women's Studies Center
Association for Women in Science
Association of Reproductive Health Professionals
CODEPINK: Women for Peace
Catholics for Choice
Choice USA
Church Women United
Claremont Graduate University, Applied Women's Studies
Coalition of Labor Union Women
Equal Rights Advocates
Equality Now
Feminist Majority Foundation
Gender Public Advocacy Coalition
Girls Incorporated
Guttmacher Institute
Hysterectomy Educational Resources and Services (HERS) Foundation
International Center for Research on Women
League of Women Voters
Legal Momentum
Million Mom March with the Brady Campaign
Ms. Foundation for Women
NARAL
National Abortion Federation
National Association for Female Executives
National Association of Women Business Owners
National Coalition of Abortion Providers
National Congress of Black Women
National Council of Jewish Women
National Council of Negro Women
National Foundation for Women Legislators
National Organization for Women
National Osteoporosis Foundation
National Women's Health Network
National Women's History Museum
National Women's History Project
National Women's Law Center
National Women's Political Caucus
National Women's Conference
National Women's Hall of Fame
National Women's Health Resource Center
Northern Illinois University Women's Studies Program
Oregon State University Women's Studies Program
Peace X Peace
Planned Parenthood Federation of America, Inc.
Religious Coalition for Reproductive Choice
Running Start: Bring Young Women to Politics
Sewall–Belmont House and Museum
Society for Women's Health Research
U.S. Women's Chamber of Commerce
United American Nurses, AFL-CIO
United Methodist Church, General Board of Church and Society
United Methodist Church, Women's Division, General Board of Global Ministries
Veteran Feminists of America
Vital Voices Global Partnership
Wider Opportunities for Women
Women's Action for New Directions
Women's International League for Peace and Freedom
Women's Ordination Conference
Women's Sports Foundation
Women for Women International
Women in Military Service for America Memorial
YWCA USA

References

External links 
National Council of Women's Organizations website

Women's political advocacy groups in the United States
Supraorganizations
Year of establishment missing